The Escravos–Lagos Pipeline System (ELPS) is a natural gas pipeline built in 1989 to supply gas from Escravos region of Niger Delta area to Egbin power station near Lagos in Nigeria. Subsequent spur lines from the ELP supply  Delta power plant at Ughelli, Warri Refining and Petrochemical Company at Ekpan, Uvwie.  The West African Portland Cement (WAPCO) Plants at Shagamu and Ewekoro, industries at Ikorodu, City Gate in lkeja Lagos.  
Since the NIPP power plants emerged   ELPS is  the major gas supply artery to the power plants in  Nigeria.

Sources of gas supply to pipeline

The pipeline start at Escravos Gas Plant (EGP) operated by Chevron which has  capacity. The EGP facilities  deliver  to the domestic gas market by Escravos–Lagos Pipeline.
Odidi gas plant operated by Neconde with actual capacity .
Oben gas plant operated by Seplat with capacity .

Technical description

Consumers

By  tee in Itoki:

By  tee to  Oben - Geregu pipeline  ELPS can supply also Geregu I and II power stations and Ajaokuta steel mills 

Natural gas pipelines in Nigeria
Natural gas in Nigeria